Chembakame is a Malayalam musical album released in 2006. Franco, Madhu Balakrishnan, Asha G Menon, Vidhu Prathap and Jyotsna are the singers and Shyam Dharman was the composer. Raju Raghavan wrote lyrics for the songs. The album was a runaway success and even made challenge to the popular film songs released at that time, being on the top for ten months. The album was released by Satyam Audios.

Track listing

Recording and release
The album was released on March 31, 2006 by Satyam Audios.

Reception
Chempakame got well acclaimed by its release. It was telecasted by local television channels and also among popular Malayalam television channels.  It became widely popular among Kerala audience.

Trivia
Chembakame is considered as the most successful musical album ever released in Malayalam. The album released in 2006 and broke all the records in musical CD business.  The songs  Sundariye Vaa and  Chembakame are still favorites.

References

2006 albums